Beijing Huiwen Middle School, previously known in English as Peking Academy, also referred to as Beijing Huiwen High School, is a public beacon high school in Dongcheng District, Beijing, China. It was established in 1871 by the Methodist Episcopal Church as Mengxueguan 蒙学馆 (School of Rudimentary Knowledge). In 1882, Huaili Shuyuan 怀理书院 (Reason-Nurturing Academy) spun off with the newly added middle- and high-school divisions. In 1882, the Academy was renamed as Huiwen Academy 汇文书院. During the Boxer Rebellion, it was burned down, then rebuilt again in 1902 with the support from local church. In 1904, it again renamed as Huiwen Daxuetang 汇文大学堂 (Huiwen College).

During the early Republican era, the college section of Huiwen College merged with Yenching University in 1918, located on campus of present-day Peking University, whereas the preparatory and high school divisions remained intact under the new title of Huiwen Xuexiao 汇文学校 (Huiwen Academy). Dr. Cai Yuanpei wrote the inscription and school motto "Zhi Ren Yong" on behalf of the Academy. Students of the high school sector played a significant role during May Fourth Movement, seen holding the school banner at a mass rally in a footage shot during that time.

In 1927, Huiwen Academy registered with the Ministry of Education of the Nanjing Government, and reformed into Jingshi Sili Huiwen Zhongxue 京师私立汇文中学 (Beijing Private Huiwen Middle School). Soon after Pacific War broke out in December 1941, Huiwen was taken over by the puppet Beijing government as Beijing No. 9 Middle School.

In August 1945, Huiwen resumed its name as Beijing Private Huiwen Middle School, with Gao Fengshan 高凤山 as Principal.

During the communist era, Huiwen became a public school under the supervision of the Education Bureau of Beijing in 1952, and gained a new name as Beijing No. 26 Middle School. It was relocated into its current address in 1959 due to the construction of Beijing railway station.

In 1989, the school regained its historic title as Beijing Huiwen Middle School permitted by the local government and became one of Beijing's first batch of beacon high schools in 2001.

Notable alumni 
 Liang Sicheng
 Jia Lanpo
 Tung-Yen Lin
 Qi Gong
 Mao Yisheng
 Peng Xuefeng
 Mike Liu

References

External links 
 

Educational institutions established in 1871
High schools in Beijing
1871 establishments in China
Schools in Dongcheng District, Beijing